In Malagasy culture, fady are a wide range of cultural prohibitions or taboos. People, places, actions or objects may be the subject of fady, which vary by region within Madagascar. The taboos are believed to be enforced by supernatural powers, and are particularly connected with Malagasy ancestor worship. Although some are held nationwide, others may be particular to regions, villages or even individual families. Fady are an integral part of Malagasy identity and play an important part in community and identity formation. The word is a descendant of Proto-Austronesian *paliSi (compare with Malay pemali, Old Javanese pali-pali).

Common prohibitions include those against pointing at a tomb, against the eating of eels by pregnant women and, for onlookers, against describing a newborn baby as ugly. New fady are created constantly. When a new initiative or business is started, a ritual offering (joro) must be made to prove that it is not fady. Those who break a fady (ota fady in the infinitive) are shunned as unclean (maloto) and for endangering the community's spiritual balance, regardless of whether or not the infraction was deliberate. Foreigners in Madagascar are advised to respect local fady and alter their behavior accordingly.

Fady also form an important influence in other aspects of Malagasy culture. The Malagasy for "please" or "excuse me" is azafady, literally translating as "may it not be fady to me".

Some writers have argued that fady are conceptually similar to unwritten social taboos in western culture, in which disregard can lead to the violator being shunned by the community.

Footnotes

Bibliography

Further reading

fady
fady
fady
fady